Sinokannemeyeria is a genus of kannemeyeriiform dicynodont that lived during the Anisian age of Middle Triassic period in what is now Shanxi, China.

Description 

It had relatively short, stumpy legs which were held slightly sprawling gait to the sides of its body. The limb girdles were formed into large, heavy plates of bone to support the weight of the wide, heavily built body. Sinokannemeyeria was probably not a fast or agile animal.

The front of the jaw had a small horn-covered beak, and there were two small tusks growing from bulbous projections on the upper jaw. These tusks could have been used to dig up roots. Compared to Kannemeyeria, it had broader snout, smaller temporal fenestrae and lower temporal crests. Sinokannemeyeria may had rather indiscriminately seized and torn vegetation in contrast to the more selective cropping of Kannemeyeria.

Classification 

Below is a cladogram from Kammerer et al. (2013):

See also
 List of therapsids

References

Anomodont genera
Middle Triassic synapsids
Triassic synapsids of Asia
Kannemeyeriiformes
Fossil taxa described in 1937
Taxa named by Yang Zhongjian